Kaare Lie (25 July 1905 – 14 June 1968) was a Norwegian footballer. He played in two matches for the Norway national football team from 1928 to 1929.

References

External links
 

1905 births
1968 deaths
Norwegian footballers
Norway international footballers
Place of birth missing
Association footballers not categorized by position